Myomimus is a genus of rodent in the family Gliridae. It contains the following species:
 Masked mouse-tailed dormouse (Myomimus personatus )
 Roach's mouse-tailed dormouse (Myomimus roachi )
 Setzer's mouse-tailed dormouse (Myomimus setzeri )

References 

 
Rodent genera
Taxa named by Sergej Ognew
Taxonomy articles created by Polbot